The Viroaga is a right tributary of the river Coțatcu in Romania. The Crângu Ursului Dam is located on this river.

References

 Lucrări hidrotehnice în administrarea a B.H. Siret 
 Lista micilor acumulari cu folosinta piscicola, de agrement sau de interes local, din categoriile C si D  

Rivers of Romania
Rivers of Vrancea County